Valentina Vadimovna Popova (born September 25, 1972 in Bratsk) is a Russian weightlifter who won two olympic medals: the silver medal in the 63 kg class at the 2000 Summer Olympics and the bronze medal in the 75 kg class at the 2004 Summer Olympics.

External links
sports-reference

1976 births
Living people
People from Bratsk
Russian female weightlifters
Weightlifters at the 2000 Summer Olympics
Weightlifters at the 2004 Summer Olympics
Olympic weightlifters of Russia
Olympic silver medalists for Russia
Olympic bronze medalists for Russia
Olympic medalists in weightlifting
Medalists at the 2004 Summer Olympics
Medalists at the 2000 Summer Olympics
European Weightlifting Championships medalists
World Weightlifting Championships medalists
Sportspeople from Irkutsk Oblast
20th-century Russian women
21st-century Russian women